In Ancient Greek philosophy, Enkrateia (Greek , "in power - from ἐν (en, “in”) + κράτος (krátos, “power”) is a state of power over something, usually a state of self-control and self-mastery where one holds power over one's own passions and instincts, or . It was first used in the context of self-control by three of Socrates' students: Isocrates, Xenophon and Plato.  For Xenophon especially, enkrateia is not just a particular virtue but "the foundation of all virtues". For Aristotle,  enkrateia  is the opposite of akrasia (ἀκρασία from ἀ = without + κράτος = power, control), which is a lack-of control over one's own desires. A person in this state of enkrateia would perform what they know to be a positive choice because of its positive consequences, while a person in a state of akrasia would perform what they know not to be a positive choice, in spite its of its negative consequences, because of the immediate pleasures the choice provides.

Notes

Concepts in ancient Greek ethics